William Fraser McDonell VC (17 December 1829 – 31 July 1894) was a British civil servant, judge and a recipient of the Victoria Cross, the highest award for gallantry in the face of the enemy that can be awarded to British and Commonwealth forces. He is one of only five civilians to have been awarded the VC.

Details
Educated at Cheltenham College and East India Company College (later succeeded by the Haileybury and Imperial Service College), he was 27 years old, and a civilian in the Bengal Civil Service during the Indian Mutiny when the following deed took place on 30 July 1857 during the retreat from Arrah for which he was awarded the VC:

He was later a Judge of the High Court of Judicature in Calcutta from 1874 to 1876.

The Medal
His VC is on display in the Lord Ashcroft Gallery at the Imperial War Museum, London.

McDonell Monument Kolkata

Adjacent to the Kolkata High Court is a  water fountain dedicated to Willam Fraser McDonell

References

External links
Location of grave (St. Peter's churchyard, Leckhampton, Gloucestershire)
William McDONELL of Cheltenham College

British recipients of the Victoria Cross
Administrators in British India
People educated at Cheltenham College
People from Cheltenham
1829 births
1894 deaths
Indian Rebellion of 1857 recipients of the Victoria Cross
Judges of the Calcutta High Court